Matthew K. Bergeron (born February 26, 2000) is a Canadian gridiron offensive tackle. A native of Quebec, he moved to the United States to play college football at Syracuse.

Early life and high school
Bergeron was born in Victoriaville, Quebec, Canada, on February 26, 2000. He grew up as a native speaker of French, learning English in school. Bergeron attended Cégep de Thetford and played for their gridiron football team before enrolling at Syracuse University to play college football for the Syracuse Orange.

College career
Bergeron played in all 12 of Syracuse's games as a freshman with five starts at right tackle. He started all 11 of the Orange's games during his sophomore season, beginning the year at right tackle before moving to left tackle for the last eight games. Bergeron was named honorable mention All-Atlantic Coast Conference (ACC) in 2021. He was named a team captain entering his junior year in 2022, being voted second-team All-ACC by the end of the season. He also attended the 2023 Senior Bowl.

References

External links
Syracuse Orange bio

2000 births
American football offensive tackles
Canadian expatriate American football people in the United States
Black Canadian players of American football
Francophone Quebec people
Gridiron football people from Quebec
Living people
Syracuse Orange football players